The Arab American Institute (AAI) is a non-profit membership organization that advocates for the interests of Arab-Americans. Founded in 1985 by James Zogby, the brother of pollster John Zogby, the organization is based in Washington, D.C.

The organization seeks to increase the visibility of Arab-American involvement and candidates in the American political system. It issues "Action Alerts" to its members much like the Anti-defamation League when issues of particular concern arise. According to its website the organization develops policy initiatives much in the manner of a think tank and encourages its members to contact Members of Congress.

Stated Goals 
The AAI has stated on its website,

Activities

Arab-American Census 

The AAI has been designated by the United States Census Bureau as the only Census Information Center for compiling data on Arab-Americans. Limitations of the sampling methodology, combined with non-response by some, under-response (only two ethnic backgrounds are tabulated and reported), and reporting ancestry as race, results in higher under reporting among Arab Americans. While the 2000 Census accounted for some 1,250,000 persons who self-identify with an Arabic-speaking origin, AAI estimates (based on research done by the Zogby International polling and marketing firm) place the population at more than 3,500,000.  They live in all 50 states—the top 11 by population are (in descending order):

California: 715,000
Michigan: 490,000
New York: 405,000
Florida: 255,000
New Jersey: 240,000
Illinois: 220,000
Texas: 210,000
Ohio: 185,000
Massachusetts: 175,000
Pennsylvania: 160,000
Virginia: 135,000

Two-thirds reside in 10 states; one-third of the total live in California, New York, and Michigan. About 94% live in metropolitan areas; Los Angeles, Detroit, New York City, Chicago and Washington, D.C., are the top 5 US metro-areas of Arab-American concentration. Lebanese-Americans constitute a greater part of the total number of Arab-Americans residing in most states; however, in New Jersey, Egyptian-Americans are the largest Arab group. The AAI believes that Americans of Arab ethnicity were underrepresented in the 2000 National Census as are most "other ethnic, minority, and immigrant populations" and believes that this undercount occurs because many Arab-Americans simply "do not understand the relevance of the census, its confidentiality, or did not respond to the question on the sample 'long form' that measures ethnic ancestry".

Annual Lobby Day 
In addition to action alerts on specific issues, and generally encouraging members and supporters to meet with their members of congress, the AAI sponsors an annual "Lobby Day."  It encourages members and supporters to visit or call their representatives on a specific date.  It also provides talking points and asks for a report on the results of visits.

Anti-Arabism 

The AAI also conducts research related to anti-Arabism in the United States. According to an AAI 2001 poll of Arab-Americans: "32% of Arab Americans reported having been subjected to some form of ethnic-based discrimination during their lifetimes, 20% reported having experienced an instance of ethnic-based discrimination since September 11. Of special concern, for example, is the fact that 45% of students and 37% of Arab Americans of the Muslim faith report being targeted by discrimination since September 11."

In July 2006, during the 2006 Lebanon War, Patrick Syring left three voice mails and sent four emails to the headquarters office of the Arab American Institute. A Federal Grand Jury in the District of Columbia returned an indictment on August 15, 2007, charging Syring with violation of Title 18 of the United States Code, Section 875(c), threatening messages in interstate commerce to injure an individual, and violation of Title 18 United States Code Section 245(b)(2)(C), by threat of force or use of force, to interfere with the civil rights of the founder and employees of the Arab American Institute. Syring pleaded guilty to the charges June 12, 2008, was sentenced to prison July 11, 2008, and was released in January 2009.

In 2001, the Coalition of American Assyrians and Maronites rebuked the Arab American Institute in a letter for categorizing Maronite Christians and Assyrians as Arabs.

Politics 
The Arab American Institute is non-partisan. That is, it does not endorse or identify with any particular political party, though the AAI's founder and president is a prominent Democrat.

In November 2008, the Arab American Institute sent a letter to Democratic Senate majority leader Harry Reid, as part of a failed attempt to block the reappointment of Senator Joe Lieberman to the chairmanship of the Senate Homeland Security and Governmental Affairs Committee. The letter cited in particular a report on Islamist extremism and the "Homegrown Terrorist Threat" completed by the committee under Lieberman's chairmanship in May 2008.

Polling of Arab attitudes toward the United States 

In collaboration with Zogby International, the AAI conducts yearly polls of Arab public opinion regarding the United States.

See also 
Arab lobby in the United States
American-Arab Anti-Discrimination Committee
Council on American-Islamic Relations

References

External links 
Arab American Institute
The Coalition of American Assyrians and Maronites letter to AAI

Arab-American culture in Washington, D.C.
Arab-American organizations
Anti-Arabism in North America
Organizations based in Washington, D.C.
Organizations established in 1985
1985 establishments in Washington, D.C.